The 2019 Arizona Wildcats baseball team represented the University of Arizona in the 2019 NCAA Division I baseball season. The Wildcats played their home games for the 8th season at Hi Corbett Field. The team was coached by Jay Johnson in his 4th season at Arizona.

Personnel

Roster

Coaches

Opening day

Schedule and results

2019 MLB draft

References

Arizona
Arizona Wildcats baseball seasons
Arizona baseball